Bocula divergens is a moth of the family Erebidae first described by Prout in 1926. It is found in Borneo, Peninsular Malaysia, Sumatra and Thailand.

References

Rivulinae